Alexia Landeau (born February 12, 1975) is a French actress. She has appeared in films such as Moonlight Mile, Marie Antoinette, 2 Days in Paris, and 2 Days in New York. She starred in Zoe Cassavetes' Day Out of Days, which premiered at the 2015 Los Angeles Film Festival.

She is the daughter of French financier Marc Landeau and Israeli luxury hotel heiress Irith Federmann-Landeau. After growing up in Paris, she moved to the United States at age 16. In 2007 she married Guilhem de Castelbajac, the artist son of French designer Jean-Charles de Castelbajac. She lives in Brooklyn.

Filmography
Feature films
 Intern (2000)
 Moonlight Mile (2002)
 Marie Antoinette (2006)
 2 Days in Paris (2007)
 2 Days in New York (2012)
 Day Out of Days (2015)

References

External links
 

1975 births
Living people
Actresses from Paris
21st-century French actresses
French film actresses
French expatriate actresses in the United States
French people of Israeli descent
French people of Jewish descent